Tamás Takács (born 10 October 1998) is a Hungarian swimmer. He competed in the 2020 Summer Olympics.

References

1998 births
Living people
Swimmers from Budapest
Swimmers at the 2020 Summer Olympics
Hungarian male swimmers
Olympic swimmers of Hungary